Robert Schultz (born July 20, 1989, in Hamilton, Ontario) is a Canadian pair skater. He formerly competed with partner Taylor Steele.

Programs 
(with Steele)

Competitive highlights 
(with Steele)

References

External links 

 

1989 births
Canadian male pair skaters
Living people
Sportspeople from Hamilton, Ontario